Encrucijada Norte is a ward (consejo popular) in Encrucijada, Cuba.

Geography
Towns in Encrucijada Norte include:
 Triunvirato
 Encrucijada (northern part)

Government 
Encrucijada has multiple District Delegate (Delegado de la Circunscripción) for every ward, Encrucijada Norte’s ward has:

 District Delegate No 1 Pablo Morales Quintana
 District Delegate No 2 Iván Luján Gutiérrez
 District Delegate No 3 Margarita Ruíz Ruíz
 District Delegate No 5 María Teresa Jiménez Reyes
 District Delegate No 6 Dianelis Roque Bello
 District Delegate No 23 Hugo Hernández Pazos
 District Delegate No 26 Eduardo Alberto Monteagudo Martín
 District Delegate No 29 Mercedes Ríos Abreu
 District Delegate No 31 Yoel Romero Calderón
 District Delegate No 33 Jorge Armando Rodríguez González
 District Delegate No 50 Jesús Días Molina

The President of the ward is Emilia Margarita Ruiz Ruiz.

Education 
Schools in Encrucijada Norte include:

 Abel Santamaría Secondary School
 Protesta de Baraguá IPE
 Roberto Coco Peredo Primary School
 Miguel Diosdado Pérez Primary School
 Manzanita Preschool

References

External links
 Encrucijada Norte (Encrucijada) in EcuRed

Populated places in Villa Clara Province
1988 establishments in North America
Populated places established in 1988
1988 establishments in Cuba